Köpenick is a historic town and locality (Ortsteil) in Berlin, situated at the confluence of the rivers Dahme and Spree in the south-east of the German capital. It was formerly known as Copanic and then Cöpenick, only officially adopting the current spelling in 1931. It is also known for the famous imposter Hauptmann von Köpenick.

Prior to its incorporation into Berlin in 1920, Köpenick had been an independent town. As a result of Berlin's 2001 administrative reform, the borough of Köpenick was merged with that of Treptow to create the current borough of Treptow-Köpenick.

Köpenick is home to the Bundesliga football club 1. FC Union Berlin, who play at the Stadion An der Alten Försterei. Mellowpark, the largest outdoor skatepark in Europe, is located in the town.

Geography

Overview
A large percentage of Köpenick's surface area is made up of pine forests and expanses of water like lake Müggelsee, which is why it is often referred to as the "green lungs" of Berlin (Grüne Lunge Berlins). The Müggelberge hills in the south-east of Köpenick reach , making them the highest natural point of Berlin.

The historic town lies in the center of the Berlin Urstromtal meltwater valley, on an island at the confluence of the Dahme and Spree rivers. The original island had been separated by two channelisation ditches, the Katzengraben and the Schlossgraben, into what are now the three islands Baumgarteninsel (plantation island), Old Town and Schlossinsel (palace island), on which the eponymous Köpenick Palace is located. The Katzengraben is now the main navigable branch of the Spree, transecting the old river bend north of the Old Town.

The Spree links Köpenick with lake Müggelsee and inner Berlin, and further via the Havel and Elbe rivers with the North Sea. The Oder–Spree Canal links the Dahme, at nearby Schmöckwitz, with the Oder river, at Eisenhüttenstadt, thus providing a navigable connection between Köpenick, the Oder and thus the Baltic Sea.

Neighborhoods
Köpenick comprises nine neighborhoods:
 The old town (Altstadt)
 Kietzer Vorstadt
 Dammvorstadt
 The North (Köpenick-Nord) with:
 Siedlung Dammfeld
 Elsengrund
 Uhlenhorst
 Wolfsgarten
 Amtsfeld and Kämmereiheide with:
 Salvador-Allende-Viertel
 Köllnische Vorstadt
 Spindlersfeld
 Wendenschloß
 Kietzer Feld

Panorama

History

While its origins are shrouded in mystery, Köpenick has had a long history as an independent town. In the 12th century, it was the residence of a Wend prince, Jaxa of Köpenick. By this time, it had probably been settled by Wend tribes for about 400 years. After Jaxa's death, the principality was reigned by the dukes of Pomerania. While Albert the Bear had taken the city of Brandenburg in 1157, and thus formed the nucleus of what would eventually become the synonymous margraviate, the area around Köpenick was conquered from the south and thus initially became part of the March of Lusatia.

While Jaxa's bracteates or hollow pennies are coined with the impression "Iaczo de Copnic", in written history, Köpenick first appeared in a deed dated 12 Feb 1210 and issued under the seal of Margrave Conrad II of Lusatia, which contains the reference "Acta sunt hec ad Copnic". 1210 is also the year when on Conrad's death power in the principality transited to the Margraviate of Meißen and the House of Wettin. Köpenick was afforded town privileges by 1232, and German colonization commenced.

Köpenick may therefore be considered one of the oldest settlements in the Margraviate of Brandenburg, predating Spandau, Berlin and Cölln, which was first mentioned in a 1237 deed. For the most part of its history, the town was known as Cöp(e)nick.

The old Cöpenick consisted of three distinct parts that co-existed for centuries on the three banks of the Frauentog, a bight in the river Dahme: the castle with its garrison, the German-settled town of artisans, peasants and merchants, and the for still some time Sorbic-speaking Kietz, a hamlet containing the fishermen.

The castle was conquered by the Ascanian margraves John I and Otto III of Brandenburg in 1245, defeating their rivals Margrave Henry III of Meissen and the Archbishop of Magdeburg.

In 1631, the emissaries of George William, Elector of Brandenburg met at Cöpenick the approaching army of Gustavus Adolphus, King of Sweden, in a vain effort to stop the ongoing devastation of the margraviate during the Thirty Years' War.

In 1906, Wilhelm Voigt, a shoemaker and drifter, masqueraded as a Prussian officer and commandeered a squad of soldiers to follow him to Cöpenick to take control of the town hall. Carl Zuckmayer perpetuated the incident in his play The Captain of Cöpenick, on which several film and television adaptations have been based.

By 1907, Cöpenick was the largest town in the county of Teltow. Under the terms of the Greater Berlin Act of 1920, Cöpenick was incorporated as the 16th, and with an area of  the largest, borough of Berlin. Apart from the former town of Cöpenick proper, the borough included the parishes of Oberschöneweide, Grünau, Schmöckwitz, Müggelheim, Rahnsdorf and Friedrichshagen. In 1931, the borough's spelling was officially amended from Cöpenick to nowadays' Köpenick.

In the months that followed the Nazi's rise to power, SA storm troops abducted and brutally tortured residents they considered political adversaries. In June 1933 the terror culminated in the Week of Blood, that left at least 24 Nazi opponents across the political spectrum dead and many more maimed. One of the sites at which the atrocities took place, the prison annex to the district court at Mandrellaplatz, has been turned into a museum.

During the Cold War, Köpenick was part of the Soviet sector and thus East Berlin.

As a result of the 2001 administrative reform, the Berlin borough of Köpenick was merged with that of Treptow to create the current borough of Treptow-Köpenick.

Until it was decommissioned in 2002, a large radio facility for MW and FM was located near the Uhlenhorst neighbourhood, including a  self-radiating radio mast, which was insulated against earth. Following decommissioning, the FM services of this facility were moved to the Fernsehturm at Alexanderplatz and the AM transmitters were moved to a new aerial mast at Zehlendorf bei Oranienburg.

Köpenick Palace

The palace (Schloss Köpenick) was originally built in 1558 as a hunting lodge by order of Elector Joachim II Hector of Brandenburg. The Renaissance style building was located on an island adjacent to the old town at the site of the former medieval fort. Joachim II died here in 1571. In 1631 it served as the headquarters of King Gustavus Adolphus of Sweden, where in vain he beseeched his brother-in-law Elector George William for assistance to his doomed campaign during the Thirty Years' War.

From 1677, Frederick I of Prussia had the hunting lodge rebuilt and enlarged. He then took residence here with his first wife Elizabeth Henrietta of Hesse-Kassel. In 1730 Frederick II of Prussia, then Crown Prince, and his friend Hans Hermann von Katte faced court-martial for desertion at Schloss Köpenick. Today the palace serves as a museum of decorative art run by the Berlin State Museums and is surrounded by a small park, which also contains a Calvinist chapel.

Culture
"Köpenick Summer" (Köpenicker Sommer) is an annual street festival which featuring music, shows and a festival parade led by the Captain of Köpenick (Hauptmann von Köpenick).

Transport
Both the rivers Dahme and Spree are navigable. The Spree connects Köpenick with the Havel and hence the waterway systems of western and central Germany. The Dahme links to the Oder-Spree Canal at nearby Schmöckwitz, thus providing a navigable connection to Eisenhüttenstadt, the Oder river and thus the Baltic Sea and Silesia.

Köpenick is served by Köpenick, Wuhlheide and Hirschgarten stations on the S3 line of the Berlin S-Bahn network, and by the Spindlersfeld terminus of S47 line. Köpenick is also a node on the Berlin tram network, with routes 27, 60, 61, 62, 63, 67 and 68 serving its neighbourhoods.

Sport
The Stadion An der Alten Försterei is home of the 1. FC Union Berlin football club.

Mellowpark is the biggest outdoor skatepark in Europe.

Grünau hosted the 1936 Olympic rowing competitions, and many athletes had lodgings there and nearby, like the American 8-man rowing team as described in Daniel James Brown's Boys in the Boat.

People
 Eugen Anton Theophil von Podbielski (1814-1879), prussian general
 Wilhelm Rietze (1903-1944), resistance fighter and communist
 Bruno Lüdke (1908-1944), German serial killer
 Maria Landrock (1923-1992), German actress
 Achim Hill (1935-2015), German rower
 Jochen Schümann (born 1954), German sailor
 Patrick Jahn (born 1983), German football player
 Georg Kössler (born 1984), German politician 
 Tim Bendzko (born 1985), German singer-songwriter
 Laura Ludwig (born 1986), German beach volleyball player
 Jörn Schlönvoigt (born 1986), German actor and singer

References

External links

 
 
  Köpenick official site
  Köpenick page on www.berlin.de

 Köpenick
Localities of Berlin
Former boroughs of Berlin